George E. McKinley (c. 1872 – July 25, 1941) was a Michigan politician.

Political life
He was elected as the Mayor of City of Flint in 1906 for the first of two 1 year terms.   He ran for reelection in 1908 but lost to Horace C. Spencer, the Republican candidate. In 1916, he ran for 13th District  Michigan state senator but lost to Hugh A. Stewart.

References

Mayors of Flint, Michigan
1870s births
1941 deaths
Michigan Democrats
20th-century American politicians